Church Street Historic District is a national historic district located at Wilmington, New Castle County, Delaware. It encompasses 26 contributing buildings, 22 of which are single family fully attached rowhouse dwellings. They are primarily two-story, brick structures. It also includes a large Second Empire building which was originally a saloon and hotel, a bar and restaurant which also has Second Empire elements, and a smaller Queen Anne style store.  The area developed between about 1880 and 1920 and many residents worked for the railroad.

It was added to the National Register of Historic Places in 1987.

Education
Residents are in the Christina School District. They are zoned to Bancroft School (K-5), Bayard School (for grades 6–8), and Newark High School.

References

Queen Anne architecture in Delaware
Second Empire architecture in Delaware
Historic districts in Wilmington, Delaware
Historic districts on the National Register of Historic Places in Delaware
National Register of Historic Places in Wilmington, Delaware